The Pennsylvania Gravity Railroad was a gravity railroad established to ship anthracite coal in Pennsylvania. It was established in 1850 and covered 47 miles to the Delaware and Hudson Canal. It was succeeded by the Erie and Wyoming Valley Railroad in 1885. A historical marker commemorates the line. Old Gravity Road and the village of Gravity were named for it.

Further reading
Pennsylvania Coal Company: Photographs of the Gravity Railroad Near Scranton, 1950

References

1885 disestablishments in Pennsylvania
Infrastructure completed in 1850
Railroad attractions in the United States
1850 establishments in Pennsylvania